In quantum field theory, the LSZ reduction formula is a method to calculate S-matrix elements (the scattering amplitudes) from the time-ordered correlation functions of a quantum field theory. It is a step of the path that starts from the Lagrangian of some quantum field theory and leads to prediction of measurable quantities.  It is named after the three German physicists Harry Lehmann, Kurt Symanzik and Wolfhart Zimmermann.

Although the LSZ reduction formula cannot handle bound states, massless particles and topological solitons,  it can be generalized to cover bound states, by use of composite fields which are often nonlocal. Furthermore, the method, or variants thereof, have turned out to be also fruitful in other fields of theoretical physics. For example, in statistical physics they can be used to get a particularly general formulation of the fluctuation-dissipation theorem.

In and out fields
S-matrix elements are amplitudes of transitions between in states and out states. An in state  describes the state of a system of particles which, in a far away past, before interacting, were moving freely with definite momenta  and, conversely, an out state  describes the state of a system of particles which, long after interaction, will be moving freely with definite momenta 

In and out states are states in Heisenberg picture so they should not be thought to describe particles at a definite time, but rather to describe the system of particles in its entire evolution, so that the S-matrix element:

is the probability amplitude for a set of particles which were prepared with definite momenta  to interact and be measured later as a new set of particles with  momenta 

The easy way to build in and out states is to seek appropriate field operators that provide the right creation and annihilation operators. These fields are called respectively in and out fields.

Just to fix ideas, suppose we deal with a Klein–Gordon field that interacts in some way which doesn't concern us:

 may contain a self interaction  or interaction with other fields, like a Yukawa interaction . From this Lagrangian, using Euler–Lagrange equations, the equation of motion follows:

where, if  does not contain derivative couplings:

This hypothesis is named the adiabatic hypothesis. However self interaction never fades away and, besides many other effects, it causes a difference between the Lagrangian mass  and the physical mass  of the  boson. This fact must be taken into account by rewriting the equation of motion as follows:

This equation can be solved formally using the retarded Green's function of the Klein–Gordon operator :

allowing us to split interaction from asymptotic behaviour. The solution is:

The factor  is a normalization factor that will come handy later, the field  is a solution of the homogeneous equation associated with the equation of motion:

and hence is a free field which describes an incoming unperturbed wave, while the last term of the solution gives the perturbation of the wave due to interaction.

It is a free scalar field so it can be expanded in plane waves:

where:

The inverse function for the coefficients in terms of the field can be easily obtained and put in the elegant form:

where:

The Fourier coefficients satisfy the algebra of creation and annihilation operators:

and they can be used to build in states in the usual way:

The relation between the interacting field and the in field is not very simple to use, and the presence of the retarded Green's function tempts us to write something like:

implicitly making the assumption that all interactions become negligible when particles are far away from each other. These interactions do not fade away as particles drift apart, so much care must be used in establishing asymptotic relations between the interacting field and the in field.

With these pieces one can state a correct and useful but very weak asymptotic relation:

The second member is indeed independent of time as can be shown by differentiating and remembering that both  and  satisfy the Klein–Gordon equation.

With appropriate changes the same steps can be followed to construct an out field that builds out states. In particular the definition of the out field is:

where  is the advanced Green's function of the Klein–Gordon operator. The weak asymptotic relation between out field and  interacting field is:

The reduction formula for scalars
The asymptotic relations are all that is needed to obtain the LSZ reduction formula. For future convenience we start with the matrix element:

which is slightly more general than an S-matrix element. Indeed,  is the expectation value of the time-ordered product of a number of fields  between an out state and an in state. The out state can contain anything from the vacuum to an undefined number of particles, whose momenta are summarized by the index . The in state contains at least a particle of momentum , and possibly many others, whose momenta are summarized by the index . If there are no fields in the time-ordered product, then  is obviously an S-matrix element. The particle with momentum  can be 'extracted' from the in state by use of a creation operator:

where the prime on  denotes that one particle has been taken out. With the assumption that no particle with momentum  is present in the out state, that is, we are ignoring forward scattering, we can write:

because  acting on the left gives zero. Expressing the construction operators in terms of in and out fields, we have:

Now we can use the asymptotic condition to write:

Then we notice that the field  can be brought inside the time-ordered product, since it appears on the right when  and on the left when :

In the following,  dependence in the time-ordered product is what matters, so we set:

It's easy to show by explicitly carrying out the time integration that:

so that, by explicit time derivation, we have:

By its definition we see that  is a solution of the Klein–Gordon equation, which can be written as:

That is:

Starting from this result, and following the same path another particle can be extracted from the in state, leading to the insertion of another field in the time-ordered product. A very similar routine can extract particles from the out state, and the two can be iterated to get vacuum both on right and on left of the time-ordered product, leading to the general formula:

Which is the LSZ reduction formula for Klein–Gordon scalars. It gains a much better looking aspect if it is written using the Fourier transform of the correlation function:

Using the inverse transform to substitute in the LSZ reduction formula, with some effort, the following result can be obtained:

Leaving aside normalization factors, this formula asserts that S-matrix elements are the residues of the poles that arise in the Fourier transform of the correlation functions as four-momenta are put on-shell.

Reduction formula for fermions
Recall that solutions to the quantized free-field Dirac equation may be written as

Consider now a scattering event consisting of an in state  of non-interacting particles approaching an interaction region at the origin, where scattering occurs, followed by an out state  of outgoing non-interacting particles. The probability amplitude for this process is given by

where no extra time-ordered product of field operators has been inserted, for simplicity. The situation considered will be the scattering of  b-type particles to  b-type particles. Suppose that the in state consists of  particles with momenta  and spins , while the out state contains particles of momenta  and spins . The in and out states are then given by

Extracting an in particle from  yields a free-field creation operator  acting on the state with one less particle. Assuming that no outgoing particle has that same momentum, we then can write

where the prime on  denotes that one particle has been taken out. Now recall that in the free theory, the b-type particle operators can be written in terms of the field using the inverse relation

where .

The weak asymptotic condition needed for a Dirac field, analogous to that for scalar fields, reads

and likewise for the out field. The scattering amplitude is then

where now the interacting field appears in the inner product. Rewriting the limits in terms of the integral of a time derivative, we have

Now, recall that  is a solution to the Dirac equation:

Switching to Dirac index notation (with sums over repeated indices) allows for a neater expression, in which the quantity in square brackets is to be regarded as a differential operator:

Consider next the matrix element appearing in the integral. Extracting an out state creation operator and subtracting the corresponding in state operator, with the assumption that no incoming particle has the same momentum, we have

Remembering that , where , we can replace the annihilation operators with in fields using the adjoint of the inverse relation. Applying the asymptotic relation, we find

Note that a time-ordering symbol has appeared, since the first term requires  on the left, while the second term requires it on the right. Following the same steps as before, this expression reduces to

The rest of the in and out states can then be extracted and reduced in the same way, ultimately resulting in

The same procedure can be done for the scattering of d-type particles, for which 's are replaced by 's, and 's and 's are swapped.

Field strength normalization
The reason of the normalization factor  in the definition of in and out fields can be understood by taking that relation between the vacuum and a single particle state  with four-moment on-shell:

where  is the four-momentum operator, we can write:

Applying the Klein–Gordon operator  on both sides, remembering that the four-moment  is on-shell and that  is the Green's function of the operator, we obtain:

So we arrive to the relation:

which accounts for the need of the factor . The in field is a free field, so it can only connect one-particle states with the vacuum. That is, its expectation value between the vacuum and a many-particle state is null. On the other hand, the interacting field can also connect  many-particle states to the vacuum, thanks to interaction, so the expectation values on the two sides of the last equation are different, and need a normalization factor in between. The right hand side can be computed explicitly, by expanding the in field in creation and annihilation operators:

leading to the relation:

by which the value of  may be computed, provided that one knows how to compute .

References

 The original paper is: 
 A pedagogical derivation of the LSZ reduction formula can be found in: Peskin and Schroeder, Section 7.2, also in Srednicki, Section I.5, or in Weinberg, pp. 436–438.

Quantum field theory